Catamola xanthomelalis is a species of snout moth in the genus Catamola. It was described by Francis Walker in 1863, and is known from Australia.

References

Moths described in 1863
Epipaschiinae